The human palatine tonsils (PT) are covered by stratified squamous epithelium that extends into deep and partly branched tonsillar crypts, of which there are about 10 to 30. The crypts greatly increase the contact surface between environmental influences and lymphoid tissue. In an average adult palatine tonsil the estimated epithelial surface area of the crypts is 295 cm2, in addition to the 45 cm2 of epithelium covering the oropharyngeal surface.

The crypts extend through the full thickness of the tonsil reaching almost to its hemicapsule. In healthy tonsils the openings of the crypts are fissure-like, and the walls of the lumina are in apposition. A computerized three-dimensional reconstruction of the palatine tonsil crypt system showed that in the centre of the palatine tonsil are tightly packed ramified crypts that join with each other, while on the periphery there is a rather simple and sparse arrangement.

The crypt system is not merely a group of invaginations of the tonsillar epithelium but a highly complicated network of canals with special types of epithelium and with various structures surrounding the canals, such as blood and lymphatic vessels and germinal centers.

Macrophages and other white blood cells concentrate by the tonsillar crypts as well, in response to the microorganisms attracted to the crypts.  Accordingly, the tonsillar crypts serve a forward sentry role for the immune system, by providing early exposure of immune system cells to infectious organisms which may be introduced into the body via food or other ingested matter.

However, the tonsillar crypts often provide such an inviting environment to bacteria that bacterial colonies may form solidified "plugs" or "stones" within the crypts.  In particular, sufferers of chronic sinusitis or post-nasal drip frequently suffer from these overgrowths of bacteria in the tonsillar crypts.  These small whitish plugs, termed "tonsilloliths" and sometimes known as "tonsil stones," have a foul smell and can contribute to bad breath; furthermore, they can obstruct the normal flow of pus from the crypts, and may irritate the throat (people with tonsil stones may complain of the feeling that something is stuck in their throat).

Lingual Tonsils in Humans also have long Crypts but, unlike the Crypts in the Palatine Tonsils, they're Unbranched.

The small folds in Adenoids are sometimes described as Crypts.

References 

Lymphatics of the head and neck
Tonsil